Patau may refer to:
 Klaus Patau, a geneticist who first reported Patau chromosome associated with Patau syndrome
 Patau chromosome, also known as Chromosome 13, associated with Patau syndrome
 Patau syndrome or Bartholin-Patau syndrome, associated with a trisomy of chromosome 13.

It may also refer to:
 Patau-Patau, a village in Labuan, Malaysia